Sorbs (also known as Lusatians or Wends), are a west Slavic people living in Lusatia.

Sorbs may also refer to:

 Sorbs (tribe), a 7th- to 10th-century Early Slavic tribe in Lower Lusatia
 Sorbs, Hérault, a commune in the Hérault département in France
 SORBS, the Spam and Open Relay Blocking System, an open proxy and open mail relay Domain Name System Black List
 SORBS1, a human gene
 SORBS2, a human gene
 SORBS3, a human gene

See also
Sorb (disambiguation)